The Best of Intentions is an adventure module published in 1987 for the Dungeons & Dragons fantasy role-playing game.

Plot summary
The Best of Intentions is a comically written adventure scenario for the Dungeons & Dragons Immortals Set, in which the player characters search for the missing immortal Mazikeen.

The player characters are rookie Immortals trying to solve a mystery of cosmic proportions. The characters compete in the Olympic Trials, journey to the weird and multifarious planes of Mazikeen, and deal with other strange events.

Publication history
IM3 The Best of Intentions was written by Ken Rolston, with a cover by Jeff Easley and interior illustrations by Jim Holloway, and was published by TSR in 1987 as a 48-page booklet with a large map and two outer folders.

Reception
Jim Bambra briefly reviewed The Best of Intentions for Dragon magazine #131 (March 1988). Bambra praised the module, saying "Colorful pregenerated characters, excellent staging, nice cut-up bits, inserts, and amusing Jim Holloway illustrations make this a real treat for would-be gods. The Best of Intentions is a fun romp through the mystical realms of the D&D game's Immortals Set. Miss this one it at your own peril."

References

Dungeons & Dragons modules
Mystara
Role-playing game supplements introduced in 1987